Articles (arranged alphabetically) related to Liberia include:


A 
 American Colonization Society
 Americo-Liberian

C 
 Communications in Liberia
 Cote d'Ivoire
 COVID-19 pandemic in Liberia
 Culture of Liberia

D 
 Demographics of Liberia
 Districts of Liberia

E 
 Economy of Liberia
 Education in Liberia
 Ellen Johnson-Sirleaf

F 
 Farm Builders
 Flag of Liberia
 Foreign relations of Liberia

G 
 Gender inequality in Liberia
 Geography of Liberia
 George Weah
 Guinea

H 
 History of Liberia

I 
 Islam in Liberia

K 
Abu Kanneh

L 
 LGBT rights in Liberia (Gay rights)
 List of cities in Liberia
 List of Liberians

M 
 Military of Liberia
 Monrovia
 Music of Liberia

N 
 Nigeria

O 
 Omega transmitter Paynesville

P 
 Politics of Liberia

S 
 Sierra Leone

T 
 Transport in Liberia

V 
 Blahsue Vonleh

W 
 West Africa

See also

Lists of country-related topics – similar lists for other countries

 
Liberia